Seth Nyquist (born 1992), better known as MorMor, is a Canadian indie pop musician.

Biography
Seth Nyquist was born in Toronto, where he grew up with his adoptive mother, English professor Mary Nyquist, and his sister. He was in a foster home initially and then got adopted by a Swedish family. "Mormor" is a reference to his grandmother, the word meaning "grandmother" in Swedish. Nyquist sang in his school's choir and played trumpet in a band. After he finished school, Nyquist started to study sociology at Toronto's Ryerson University. He dropped out after one semester at Ryerson, and decided to focus on his musical career instead. He took piano and vocal training.

In 2015, he released his debut EP, Live for Nothing, under the moniker MorMor. In 2018, MorMor released the EP Heaven's Only Wishful through his own label, Don't Guess.

In 2019, he received a SOCAN Songwriting Prize nomination for the song "Whatever Comes to Mind".

Discography
Albums
 Semblance (2022)

EPs
 Live for Nothing (2015)
 Heaven's Only Wishful (2018)
 Some Place Else (2019)

Singles
 "Heaven's Only Wishful" (2018)
 "Whatever Comes to Mind" (2018)
 "Waiting on the Warmth" (2018)
 "Pass the Hours" (2018)
 "Outside" (2019)
 "Won't Let You" (2019)
 "Don't Cry" (2020)
 "Far Apart" (2022)
 "Seasons Change" (2022)

References

External links
 

Canadian pop singers
Musicians from Toronto
21st-century Black Canadian male singers
1992 births
Living people
Canadian indie pop musicians
Toronto Metropolitan University alumni
Canadian adoptees